Princess Louise of Schleswig-Holstein may refer to:

Louise of Hesse-Kassel (1817-1898), wife of Christian IX of Denmark (previously a prince of Schleswig-Holstein-Sonderburg-Glücksburg)
Princess Louise of Schleswig-Holstein-Sonderburg-Glücksburg (1858-1936), daughter of Friedrich, Duke of Schleswig-Holstein-Sonderburg-Glücksburg, wife of George Victor, Prince of Waldeck and Pyrmont
Princess Louise Sophie of Schleswig-Holstein-Sonderburg-Augustenburg (1866-1952), daughter of Frederick VIII, Duke of Schleswig-Holstein, wife of Prince Friedrich Leopold of Prussia
Princess Marie Louise of Schleswig-Holstein (1872-1956), daughter of Prince Christian of Schleswig-Holstein and Princess Helena of the United Kingdom, wife of Prince Aribert of Anhalt

See also 
Louise (disambiguation)